Bihat Biram, also spelled Behat, is a village in Machhrehta block of Sitapur district, Uttar Pradesh, India. As of 2011, its population was 2,852, in 564 households.

History 
According to tradition, Bihat Biram was founded in 1459 by a Kachhwaha prince of Amer named Biram Singh, after whom the town was named. In the late 1800s, the village's Kachhwaha zamindars claimed descent from him, 11 generations later.

References

Villages in Sitapur district